Sørbygda, Sørbygd, or Sørbygdi are place names in the Norwegian language.  The prefix "sør-" means "southern" and the root word "bygd(a/i)" refers to a "village" or "rural countryside".  The name may refer to the following places in Norway:

Places
Sørbygda, Viken, a village in Lørenskog municipality in Viken county, Norway
Sørbygda, Stange, a village in Stange municipality in Innlandet county, Norway
Sørbygda, Vestland, a village in Etne municipality in Vestland county, Norway
Sørbygdi, Flå, a village in Flå municipality in Innlandet county, Norway
Ytre Sørbygda, a village in Snåsa municipality in Trøndelag county, Norway
Øvre Sørbygda, a village in Snåsa municipality in Trøndelag county, Norway

See also
Nordbygda (disambiguation)
Austbygda (disambiguation)
Vestbygda (disambiguation)